Akshara Kishor, credited as Baby Akshara, is an Indian child actress who predominantly works in Malayalam television soap's and Films. She is known for her role as Balachandrika in the series Karuthamuthu on Asianet. In 2014, she made her debut film through Mathai Kuzhappakkaranalla, directed by Akku Akbar.

Early life and career 

Akshara was born to Kishor, an architect and Hemaprabha, a bank employee in Kannur. Later they shifted to Eranakulam. She has a sister named Akhila Kishor.

Akshara is well known popular for her role Balachandrika in the tele-serial Karuthamuthu which is being telecast on Asianet channel. Before coming to the limelight, she made her appearance in several advertisements in which the ads Kalayan Silks, Nirapara and Jayalakshmi are much notable. She made her debut to the Malayalam film industry in 2014 through Mathai Kuzhappakkaranalla, which is directed by Akku Akbar.

Filmography

Television

Awards and nominations

Won,  Asianet Television awards 2016 – Best Child Artist - Karuthamuthu 
 Won, 2nd Asianet comedy awards for Best child artist -  Vettah, Aadupuliyattam 
 Nominated, 19 th Asianet film awards for Best child artist -  Aadupuliyattam,  Thoppil Joppan 
Nominated,  Asianet Television awards 2017– Best Child Artist - Karuthamuthu
Kerala Film Critics Association Awards 2017 - Best Child Artist - Aadupuliyattam
Kerala Film Critics Association Awards 2019 - Best Child Artist - Pengalila, Samaksham

References

External links
 

Actresses from Kottayam
Indian child actresses
Living people
Actresses in Malayalam cinema
Indian film actresses
21st-century Indian actresses
Child actresses in Malayalam cinema
Indian television actresses
Actresses in Malayalam television
Year of birth missing (living people)